An electrically small or electrically short antenna is an antenna much shorter than the wavelength of the signal it is intended to transmit or receive.  Electrically short antennas are generally less efficient and more challenging to design than longer antennas such as quarter- and half-wave antennas, but are nonetheless common due to their compact size and low cost.

Definition
Technically, an electrically short antenna has length 2h, such that , where λ is the free space wavelength.

The far-field radiation pattern of an antenna is the sum of its near-field spherical modes, expressed using Legendre functions and spherical Bessel functions. In its simplest form, it is an omnidirectional radiation pattern with no variation in the azimuth plane. When the antenna becomes electrically small, the propagating modes are replaced by evanescent modes with high Q factor, where

In short, the maximum bandwidth of an electrically small antenna is regulated by its maximum dimension enclosed within a sphere of radius .

The difficulties of designing an electrically small antenna includes:

 impedance matching, 
 a small radiation resistance therefore requiring a large current and resulting ohmic losses, thus poor radiation efficiency.

History 

Harold A. Wheeler began the study of the limits of small antennas with a seminal paper in 1947, "The Fundamental Limitations of Small Antennas". Wheeler demonstrated the relationship between the radiation power factor and the geometrical parameters of electrically small cylindrical inductors and cylindrical capacitors in a circuit analysis. Shortly after, L. J. Chu derived the theoretical minimum Q factor for an electrically small antenna via an expansion of spherical modes.

Much later, in 1964, Collin and Rothschild found an expression for the minimum Q for the lowest order spherical wave in the form

which has become a common reference standard used in later evaluations of small antenna performance.

Examples 
In addition to the lumped-element capacitor and inductor antennas, there are various types of electrically small antennas that include the Goubau antenna, Foltz antenna and Rogers cone antenna. The lumped-element capacitor and inductor antenna is typically made of a combination of the capacitor and inductor lumped element antenna and self-resonating distributed element antennas.

Principal new type of electrically small antennas are nanomechanical magnetoelectric (ME) antennas. ME antennas have sizes as small as one-thousandth of a wavelength. For example, the length and width of the FeGaB/AlN active resonant body of this antenna for 60.7 MHz of electromagnetic waves are 200 and 50 μm, respectively.

Fundamental limitations of antennas 
Electrically small antennas belong to one of the four fundamental limitations of antennas addressed by R. C. Hansen. The four fundamental limitations of antennas are, electrically small antennas, superdirective antennas, superresolution antennas, and high-gain antennas.

Measurement 
Passive measurement of an electrically small antenna requires a quarter-wavelength RF choke or ferrite bead to be added to the end of the feeding coaxial cable to limit or prevent the current from flowing onto the surface of the cable. Current flowing on the exterior of the feeding cable increases the electrical size and radiation aperture of the antenna, resulting in erroneous measurement result. The quarter-wavelength choke are narrow-band and the ferrite beads are lossy at higher frequency greater than 1 GHz.  These techniques are not without problems; the quarter-wavelength choke technique allows currents to travel up to 0.25 wavelengths from the antenna and increases the effective size, whereas the lossy choke (e.g. ferrite bead) technique introduces losses that should be considered.

See also  
 Electrical length - the concept of a conductor's electrical length, in particular, for transmission line and antennas.

References 

Antennas (radio)
Electromagnetic radiation
Radio frequency antenna types
Radio electronics